

Past seasons

Episodes

Season 41 (2021)

Season 42 (2022)

Season 43 (2022)

Season 44 (2023)

References

External links 
 
 

Survivor (American TV series)
Lists of American reality television series episodes